Tony Francisco Peña (born March 23, 1981) is a Dominican former professional baseball pitcher. Peña played shortstop until the 2009 season, when he converted to pitching.

When he retired from playing, Peña moved on to coaching. He is currently a major league coach for the Kansas City Royals of Major League Baseball (MLB).

Family
Peña is the son of Tony Peña and the brother of Francisco Peña. His uncle, Ramón Peña, pitched for the Detroit Tigers in 1989.

Playing career

Atlanta Braves
A non-drafted free agent, Peña was signed on July 21, 1999 by the Atlanta Braves. He made his big league debut with Atlanta on April 13, 2006. His first Major League hit came on April 21 at Washington against the Nationals.  He appeared in 40 games for the Braves, batting .227 with a home run and three RBIs in 44 at-bats.

Kansas City Royals
On March 23, 2007, Peña was traded to Kansas City for pitching prospect Erik Cordier. In Peña's first game as a Royal, he hit two triples. Peña finished 2007, his first full season, at .267/.284/.356 with two homers and 47 RBIs.  He also hit seven triples and stole five bases. 
  
Pena lost his job as a regular starter in the middle of 2008. From June through the end of 2008, Pena mainly entered games as a defensive replacement. Pena made his major league pitching debut on July 21, performing mop-up duty in a 19–4 blowout loss to the Detroit Tigers. He pitched a 1-2-3 inning with a strikeout of Iván Rodríguez. Pena made 75 plate appearances in 46 games through the last four months of the 2008 season and was designated for assignment by the Kansas City Royals on July 16, 2009.

San Francisco Giants
On December 11, 2009, Peña, signed a minor league contract with the San Francisco Giants to try to be a pitcher and was placed with the Richmond Flying Squirrels, the Giants' AA team.

Boston Red Sox
On January 5, 2011, he signed a minor-league deal with the Boston Red Sox.

Vaqueros Laguna
Pena was released by the Vaqueros Laguna on June 16, 2016.

Saraperos de Saltillo
On June 19, 2016, Peña signed with the Saraperos de Saltillo of the Mexican Baseball League.

Olmecas de Tabasco
On May 19, 2017, Peña was released by the Olmecas de Tabasco of the Mexican Baseball League. He ultimately would not appear in another professional baseball game.

Second stint with Royals
On May 30, 2017, Peña signed a minor league deal with the Kansas City Royals.

Coaching career
Peña managed the AZL Royals during the 2019 season.

He was named the bench coach of the Omaha Storm Chasers prior to the 2020 season which ultimately was not played due to the COVID-19 pandemic. In January 2021, it was announced that he would join the Royals' big league coaching staff.

See also
 List of second-generation Major League Baseball players

References

External links

1981 births
Living people
Águilas Cibaeñas players
Arizona League Royals players
Atlanta Braves players
Bravos de Margarita players
Burlington Bees players
Central American and Caribbean Games bronze medalists for the Dominican Republic
Charlotte Knights players
Danville Braves players
Dominican Republic baseball coaches
Dominican Republic expatriate baseball players in Mexico
Dominican Republic expatriate baseball players in the United States
Fresno Grizzlies players
Grand Canyon Rafters players
Greenville Braves players
Jamestown Jammers players
Kansas City Royals coaches
Kansas City Royals players
Macon Braves players
Major League Baseball players from the Dominican Republic
Major League Baseball shortstops
Mexican League baseball pitchers
Myrtle Beach Pelicans players
Olmecas de Tabasco players
Omaha Royals players
Pawtucket Red Sox players
Richmond Braves players
Richmond Flying Squirrels players
Saraperos de Saltillo players
Vaqueros Laguna players
Competitors at the 2002 Central American and Caribbean Games
Central American and Caribbean Games medalists in baseball
Dominican Republic expatriate baseball players in Venezuela
People from Santiago de los Caballeros